The Man They Couldn't Arrest is a 1931 British crime film directed by T. Hayes Hunter and starring Hugh Wakefield, Gordon Harker, Garry Marsh and Dennis Wyndham. Based on a novel by "Seamark" (Austin J. Small, it was made by Gainsborough Pictures at Islington Studios in London.

Plot summary
An amateur detective goes on the trail of a gang of violent criminals.

Cast
 Hugh Wakefield as John Dain
 Gordon Harker as Tansey
 Garry Marsh as Delbury
 Nicholas Hannen as Lyall
 Robert Farquharson as Count Lazard
 Renee Clama as Marcia
 Dennis Wyndham as Shaughnessy

References

Bibliography
Wood, Linda. British Films, 1927–1939. British Film Institute, 1986.

External links

1931 films
British crime films
1931 crime films
Films directed by T. Hayes Hunter
British black-and-white films
Gainsborough Pictures films
Islington Studios films
1930s English-language films
1930s British films